Campo Cuatro Milpas National Airport, also known as Guasave National Airport, is an airport located at Guasave, a city located in the northwestern part of the state of Sinaloa in Mexico.

Facilities

Airlines and destinations

References

External links
 Aerial image of Campo Cuatro Milpas at OurAirports.com

Airports in Sinaloa
Guasave